Beverley Vozenilek is a former American politician who served as a member of the Washington State Senate representing Washington's 28th legislative district as a Republican.  She was appointed on August 2, 1979 after Charles Newschwander resigned and was appointed to the Board of Tax Appeals.  She served until she was succeeded by Ted Haley after he won special election in November 1979.

References

Republican Party Washington (state) state senators
Women state legislators in Washington (state)